Hololepta yucateca is a species of clown beetle in the family Histeridae. It is found in Central America and North America.

Subspecies
These two subspecies belong to the species Hololepta yucateca:
 Hololepta yucateca princeps J. L. LeConte, 1860
 Hololepta yucateca yucateca (Marseul, 1853)

References

Further reading

 

Histeridae
Articles created by Qbugbot
Beetles described in 1853